The 27th Golden Rooster Awards was an award ceremony honoring the best Chinese language films of 2008–09. The award ceremony was held in Jiangxi, Nanjing.

Winners and nominees

Special awards
 Lifetime Achievement Award
 Qin Yi
 Yu Lan 
 Special Jury Award
 Film: Axis of War: The First of August 
 Screenwriter: Cheng Xiaoling (The Clear Water)

References

External links 

2008-2009
Golden
Gold